Wong Wai Lap (born 16 July 1969) is a Hong Kong former badminton player. He competed in the men's singles tournament at the 1992 Summer Olympics.

References

External links
 

1969 births
Living people
Hong Kong male badminton players
Olympic badminton players of Hong Kong
Badminton players at the 1992 Summer Olympics
Place of birth missing (living people)
20th-century Hong Kong people
Medallists at the 1994 Commonwealth Games
Commonwealth Games bronze medallists for Hong Kong
Commonwealth Games medallists in badminton